Colquhoun is a surname of Scottish origin. It is a habitational name from the barony of Colquhoun in Dunbartonshire. The Scottish Clan Colquhoun originated there. The name is possibly derived from the Gaelic elements còil ("nook"), cùil ("corner"), or coill(e) ("wood") + cumhann ("narrow"), or comh-thonn ("the beating of waves together").

Phonetically, MacOlquhoun is similar to MacElhone/MacIlhone and therefore may derive from the name the Gaelic name Mac Giolla Còmhghan. Còmhghan is derived from comh ("together") and gan-, gen- ("born").

Calhoun, Colhoun, Calhoon, Colhoon, Cohoon, Hoon, Cahoun, and Cahoon are variants of the surname Colquhoun. They are generally found only in the United States of America, where conversely the original spelling Colquhoun is rare.

People with the surname

Arts and entertainment
 Alan Colquhoun, architect and architectural theorist
 Alexander Colquhoun (artist)
 Archibald Colquhoun, translator
 Amalie Sara Colquhoun, Australian landscape and portrait painter
 Christian Colquhoun, special effects designer
 Christopher Colquhoun, British actor
 Connor Colquhoun, Welsh YouTuber
 Frances Mary Colquhoun (born 1836), Scottish writer
 Ian Colquhoun (Scottish author), Scottish author and actor
 Ithell Colquhoun, British surrealist painter
 Joe Colquhoun, British comics artist
 Robert Colquhoun, Scottish artist
 Sophie Colquhoun, Actress

Governance
 Archibald Colquhoun (politician), Scottish politician and lawyer
 A. R. Colquhoun, Scottish explorer and colonial administrator
 Edward Alexander Colquhoun, mayor of Hamilton, Ontario
 Iain Colquhoun, Scottish baronet
 Maureen Colquhoun, British politician
 William Colquhoun, Canadian businessman and politician
 Colquhoun baronets, from two baronetcies created for members of the Colquhoun family

Science
 David Colquhoun, British scientist
 Patrick Colquhoun, statistician, police magistrate, founder of the Thames River Police
 Howard Colquhoun, British scientist

Sport
 Arjen Colquhoun, former American Football linebacker
 Eddie Colquhoun, Scottish international footballer
 Ian Colquhoun, New Zealand cricketer
 John Colquhoun (sportsman), Scottish sportsman and sportswriter
 John Mark Colquhoun, Scottish footballer
 Leroy Colquhoun, Jamaican sprinter
 Sam Colquhoun, Australian rules footballer

Others
 John Frederick Colquhoun, member of the World Scout Committee
 Colquhoun Grant, British army officer of the Peninsular War

See also
 Cahoon, a variant name
 Colhoun (disambiguation), a variant name
 Clan Colquhoun, a Scottish clan bearing the name
 Colquhoun Peak, a mountain in Washington state

References

Surnames of Scottish origin